Volgograd Synagogue was a historic synagogue built in 1888 in than Tsaritsyn, now Volgograd. It was destroyed during the Battle of Stalingrad after the invasion of German forces, and rebuilt after World War II. In the early 21st century, it is undergoing restoration. It serves the Jewish community of Volgograd, Russia.

See also
List of Synagogues in Russia

References

Synagogues in Russia
Buildings and structures in Volgograd
Cultural heritage monuments of regional significance in Volgograd Oblast